Walter Samuel Goodland (December 22, 1862March 12, 1947) was an American lawyer and politician and the 31st Governor of Wisconsin. He was a member of the Republican Party and attended Lawrence University in Appleton, Wisconsin.

Biography

Goodland, born in Sharon, Wisconsin,  was a lawyer and newspaper owner; he had owned a newspaper in Michigan in Iron Mountain. Goodland spent time on the Gogebic Range as a young man. He came to the range and began practicing law in Wakefield, Michigan. There he began the Wakefield Bulletin, one of the early daily newspapers of the range. Later, he established the Ironwood Times, disposing of it in May 1895 to Bennett and Green. The Ironwood Times continued to publish until May 1946. Goodland served in the Wisconsin State Senate. From 1911 to 1915, he was mayor of Racine, Wisconsin. From 1939 to 1943, Walter Goodland was the 29th Lieutenant Governor of Wisconsin.

In 1942, he was reelected lieutenant governor. On December 7, 1942, Governor-elect Orland Steen Loomis died before his inaugural. The Wisconsin Supreme Court ruled that Lieutenant Governor Goodland would serve Orland Loomis's term as governor, overriding the view of Governor Julius Heil that he should continue in office. Goodland was initially paid as the Lieutenant Governor, with a salary of $1,500 a year. He earned a six dollar daily bonus for being governor while the legislature was in session, and a five dollar daily bonus when it was not.

In 1944, Walter Goodland was elected Governor of Wisconsin in his own right, and in 1946 he was reelected. Walter Goodland died of a heart attack on Wednesday, March 12, 1947, while in office in Madison, Wisconsin, at age 84.

At the time of his death, Goodland was the oldest individual to have served as governor of any state in the union. He also had the distinction of both assuming and relinquishing the office of governor due to a death, the death of Loomis and his own.

Honors
Goodland Hall at Mendota Mental Health Institute was named for the governor.
Walter Goodland Elementary School, Racine, Wisconsin was named in his honor.
Goodland Park, one of Dane County's oldest parks, named for Wisconsin's oldest governor.

References

External links
Walter S. Goodland, Dictionary of Wisconsin History, Wisconsin State Historical Society
Walter S. Goodland, Wisconsin State Historical Society, articles

1862 births
1947 deaths
People from Sharon, Wisconsin
American publishers (people)
Republican Party governors of Wisconsin
Lawrence University alumni
Lieutenant Governors of Wisconsin
Mayors of Racine, Wisconsin
Politicians from Madison, Wisconsin
Republican Party Wisconsin state senators
People from Wakefield, Michigan